Robert Michael Bobo (born April 9, 1974) is an American college football coach who is currently the offensive coordinator and quarterbacks coach for the Georgia Bulldogs.  He was the head coach of the Colorado State Rams football team from 2015 to 2019.

Playing career
Bobo played for the Thomasville High School Bulldogs (Thomasville, Georgia) before playing college football at the University of Georgia. 

As a senior in 1997, he threw for 2,751 yards, going 199/306 on passing attempts with 19 touchdowns and eight interceptions. He set various passing records during his career, including career passer rating.

Coaching career

Georgia
Bobo remained at Georgia as a member of the football administrative staff under Jim Donnan. After one year as a graduate assistant, he went to Jacksonville State as quarterbacks coach.

A year later, he returned to Georgia as quarterbacks coach under newly hired Mark Richt. He was promoted to offensive coordinator in 2007. He is widely known for his knack in grooming successful quarterbacks like Matthew Stafford, Aaron Murray, and David Greene. In 2012, Bobo was a finalist for the Broyles Award, given annually to the nation's top college football assistant coach.

Colorado State
On December 23, 2014, Bobo took the head coaching job at Colorado State University, that was previously held by Jim McElwain who left for the head coaching vacancy at the University of Florida. Coming off McElwain's 10-3 season, Bobo's first three teams went 7–6, with all losing in low-level bowl games. In 2017, they began play in newly built Canvas Stadium.

The 2018 season started disastrously, as Colorado State lost badly to Hawaii in their home opener, Colorado, Florida, and FCS Illinois State. Their lone win during that stretch came with a come-from-behind victory at home against Arkansas. The Rams finished a dismal 3-9, their worst record since the Steve Fairchild era.

The 2019 season showed little improvement, as the Rams finished 4–8, including losing to rivals Colorado, Air Force, and Wyoming for the 4th consecutive year.  Calls for Bobo's firing gained steam throughout the season. Just over 12,000 people attended the final home game against Boise State, one of the Rams' worst home crowds since before Sonny Lubick's arrival. Bobo and CSU mutually agreed to part ways just days later.

South Carolina
Following his dismissal from Colorado State, Bobo was named the offensive coordinator and quarterbacks coach for South Carolina on December 10, 2019. South Carolina named him interim head coach on November 15, 2020, after firing Will Muschamp. Bobo was retained as offensive coordinator by newly hired Gamecocks head coach Shane Beamer for the 2021 season, but soon left to become the offensive coordinator on Bryan Harsin's inaugural Auburn staff.

Auburn
Bobo joined the Auburn football staff as the offensive coordinator and quarterbacks coach for the 2021 football season.  He was fired on November 29, 2021, following a four overtime loss to Alabama.

Return to Georgia
On January 28, 2022, Bobo was hired by Georgia as an offensive analyst. Following Todd Monken leaving to take the vacant offensive coordinator position for the NFL's Baltimore Ravens, Bobo was promoted to the position of offensive coordinator for the Bulldogs.  He was part of the coaching staff on the Georgia team that defeated TCU in the National Championship.

Head coaching record

Notes

References

External links
 Colorado State profile

1974 births
Living people
American football quarterbacks
Colorado State Rams football coaches
Georgia Bulldogs football coaches
Georgia Bulldogs football players
Jacksonville State Gamecocks football coaches
Players of American football from Georgia (U.S. state)
South Carolina Gamecocks football coaches